Several newspapers are named The News Herald or The News-Herald, including:

 The Marshfield News-Herald
 The News Herald (Panama City)
 The News-Herald (Southgate, Michigan)
 The News Herald (North Carolina)
 The News-Herald (Franklin, Pennsylvania)
 The News-Herald (Vancouver, Canada)
 The News-Herald (Ohio) – in Lake County, Ohio
 News Herald (Ohio) – in Port Clinton, Ohio
 The News-Herald (Owenton, Kentucky)
 Roanoke-Chowan News-Herald
 Today's News-Herald
 Borger News-Herald